The 2018–19 American Athletic Conference women's basketball season began with practices in October 2017, followed by the start of the 2018–19 NCAA Division I women's basketball season in November. Conference play started in January 2018 and will conclude in March with the 2019 American Athletic Conference women's basketball tournament at Mohegan Sun Arena in Uncasville, CT.

Head coaches

Coaching changes 

 Cincinnati did not renew the contract of Jamelle Elliott upon its expiration at the end of the 2017–18 season. Michelle Clark-Heard, previously head coach at Western Kentucky, was named as her replacement.

Coaches 

Notes:

 Year at school includes 2018–19 season.
 Overall and AAC records are from time at current school and are through the end the 2017–18 season.
 NCAA Tournament appearances are from time at current school only.
 NCAA Final Fours and Championship include time at other schools

Preseason

AAC Women's Basketball Tip-off 
Prior to the start of the season, the AAC head coaches voted on the finishing order of the teams, a Preseason All-Conference First Team, Preseason All-Conference Second Team, and a Preseason Player of the Year.

In the vote, all eligible head coaches selected Connecticut to win the 2018–19 season. Connecticut head coach Geno Auriemma, barred by conference rules from voting for his own team, voted for South Florida.

AAC preseason poll 

Preseason All-AAC Teams

Preseason AAC Player of the Year

Regular season

Rankings 

Note: The Coaches Poll releases a final poll after the NCAA tournament, but the AP Poll does not release a poll at this time.

Conference matrix 
This table summarizes the head-to-head results between teams in conference play. Each team will play 18 conference games, and at least 1 against each opponent.

Player of the week 
Throughout the conference regular season, the American Athletic Conference offices named a Player(s) of the week and a Rookie(s) of the week.

Postseason

AAC tournament 

Note: * denotes overtime

NCAA tournament

National Invitation tournament

Honors and awards

AAC Awards

WNBA Draft

References